Captain Edward Charles Ellice (1 January 1858 – 21 February 1934) was Liberal MP for St Andrews Burghs.

Background
He was the son of Robert Ellice (1816–1858) and Eglantine "Tina" Balfour (1816–1907), the grandson of Robert Ellice and Eliza Courtney, a grandnephew of Edward Ellice, and a cousin and the heir of the latter's son, heir and namesake, Edward Ellice, who was a previous MP for the constituency.

He married Margaret Georgiana Thomas (1865–1929), daughter of cricketer Freeman Thomas and sister of Major Freeman Freeman-Thomas, 1st Marquess of Willingdon, on 11 April 1889. They had ten children:

Marion Ellice (8 October 1890)
Edward Ellice (6 December 1891 – about 1893)
Isobel Ellice (18 November 1892)
Alexander Ellice (19 November 1894 – 16 October 1916) died in World War I, age 21 
Margaret Ellice (19 March 1896)
Andrew Robert Ellice (13 October 1897 – 28 September 1916) died in World War I, age 18
William Ellice (19 December 1898 – 26 November 1914) died in World War I when an internal explosion sank , age 15
Eglantine Ellice (9 January 1900 – 1989)
Russell Ellice (14 November 1902 – 1989)
Charles Ellice (7 March 1905)

He was deputy-director of the Invergarry and Fort Augustus Railway.

Military career
Ellice was commissioned in the Grenadier Guards in October 1877, and promoted to captain on 5 August 1886. Following the outbreak of the Second Boer War in late 1899, he joined Lord Lovat's Corps as a captain of mounted infantry on 21 February 1900. The corps was raised by Simon Fraser, 14th Lord Lovat and served in South Africa through the war.

Political career
Ellice was elected at the 1903 St Andrews Burghs by-election, gaining the seat from the Liberal Unionists. He sought re-election at the 1906 General Election but was narrowly defeated.

Electoral record

References 

  A Genealogical and Heraldic History of the Landed Gentry of Great Britain & Ireland, Volume 1, by Bernard Burke; Harrison; England; 1894, p. 575.
 Notices of the Ellises of England, Scotland, and Ireland, from the conquest to the present time, by William Smith Ellis; London, England; 1866, p.140.

External links 

1858 births
1934 deaths
Scottish Liberal Party MPs
Members of the Parliament of the United Kingdom for Scottish constituencies
UK MPs 1900–1906
Deputy Lieutenants of Inverness-shire
Members of the Parliament of the United Kingdom for Fife constituencies
20th-century Scottish politicians
Lovat Scouts officers
Grenadier Guards officers
British Army personnel of the Second Boer War